The DarkSide collaboration is an international affiliation of universities and labs seeking to directly detect dark matter in the form of weakly interacting massive particles (WIMPs). The collaboration is planning, building and operating a series of liquid argon time projection chambers (TPCs) that are employed at the Gran Sasso National Laboratory in Assergi, Italy. The detectors are filled with liquid argon from underground sources in order to exclude the radioactive isotope , which makes up one in every 1015 (quadrillion) atoms in atmospheric argon.  The Darkside-10 (DS-10) prototype was tested in 2012, and the Darkside-50 (DS-50) experiment has been operating since 2013. Darkside-20k (DS-20k) with 20 tonnes of liquid argon is being planned as of 2019.

Darkside-10 

The Darkside-10 prototype detector had 10 kg of liquid argon. It was built at Princeton University and operated there for seven months, after which it was transported to Gran Sasso National Laboratory in 2011. The detector operated in Gran Sasso 2011-2012.

Status 

Darkside-50 has 46 kg argon target mass. A 3-year run is planned and ton-scale expansion has been proposed.

Initial results using a month of running were reported in 2014. Spin-independent limits were set using 1422 kg×days of exposure to atmospheric argon.

Members
The following institutions' physics departments include members of DarkSide:
 Augustana College, USA
 Black Hills State University, USA
 Drexel University, USA
 Fermi National Accelerator Laboratory, USA
 The University of Chicago, USA
 Princeton University, USA
 Temple University, USA
 University of Arkansas, USA
 University of California at Los Angeles, USA
 University of California at Davis, USA
 University of Houston, USA
 University of Massachusetts at Amherst, USA
 University of Hawaii, USA
 Virginia Tech, USA
 Williams College, USA
 University College of London, GB
 Royal Holloway, University of London, GB
 INFN – Laboratori Nazionali del Gran Sasso, Italy
 INFN – Università degli Studi di Genova, Italy
 INFN – Università degli Studi di Milano, Italy
 INFN – Università degli Studi di Napoli, Italy
 INFN – Università degli Studi di Perugia, Italy
 INFN – Università degli Studi di Cagliari, Italy
 CERN – The European Organization for Nuclear Research, Switzerland/France
 Jagiellonian University, Cracow, Poland
 Joint Institute for Nuclear Research, Dubna, Russia
 Lomonosov Moscow State University, Russia
 Novosibirsk State University, Russia
 Institute for Nuclear Research of NASU, Kiev, Ukraine
 RRC Kurchatov Institute, Russia
 National Research Nuclear University, Moscow, Russia
 Institute for Theoretical and Experimental Physics, Moscow, Russia
 St. Petersburg Nuclear Physics Institute, Gatchina, Russia

See also

ANAIS
ArDM
CDEX
CDMS
CRESST
DAMA/NaI
DAMA/LIBRA
DEAP
DRIFT
EDELWEISS
LZ experiment
LUX
PICASSO
SIMPLE
WARP
XENON
ZEPLIN

References

Publications 
 
 
 
 
 
 DarkSide Collaboration, “DarkSide-50 Proposal” (2008).

External links
 Project website

Experiments for dark matter search